The Vrije Universiteit Brussel (abbreviated VUB) is a Dutch and English-speaking research university located in Brussels, Belgium. It has four campuses: Brussels Humanities, Science and Engineering Campus (in Elsene), Brussels Health Campus (in Jette), Brussels Technology Campus (in Anderlecht) and Brussels Photonics Campus (in Gooik).

The Vrije Universiteit Brussel was formed in 1970 by the splitting of the Free University of Brussels, which was founded in 1834 by the lawyer and liberal politician Pierre-Théodore Verhaegen. The founder aimed to establish a university independent from state and church, where academic freedom would be prevalent. This is today still reflected in the university's motto , or "Conquering darkness by science", and in its more recent slogan , or "Reasonably opinionated". Accordingly, the university is pluralistic – it is open to all students on the basis of equality regardless of their ideological, political, cultural or social background – and it is managed using democratic structures, which means that all members – from students to faculty – participate in the decision-making processes.

VUB is a strongly research-oriented institute, which is positioned among the world's Top 200 universities according to the 2021 QS World University Ranking. Its research articles are on average more cited than articles by any other Flemish university.
The university is organised into 8 faculties that accomplish the three central missions of the university: education, research, and service to the community. The faculties cover a broad range of fields of knowledge including the natural sciences, classics, life sciences, social sciences, humanities, and engineering. The university provides bachelor, master, and doctoral education to about 8,000 undergraduate and 1,000 graduate students.

History

Establishment of a university in Brussels

The history of the Vrije Universiteit Brussel is closely linked with that of Belgium itself. When the Belgian State was formed in 1830 by nine breakaway provinces from the Kingdom of the Netherlands, three state universities existed in the cities of Ghent, Leuven and Liège, but none in the new capital, Brussels. Since the government was reluctant to fund another state university, a group of leading intellectuals in the fields of arts, science, and education — amongst whom the study prefect of the Royal Athenaeum of Brussels, Auguste Baron, as well as the astronomer and mathematician Adolphe Quetelet — planned to create a private university, which was permitted under the Belgian Constitution.

In 1834, the Belgian episcopate decided to establish a Catholic university in Mechelen with the aim of regaining the influence of the Catholic Church on the academic scene in Belgium, and the government had the intent to close the university at Leuven and donate the buildings to the Catholic institution. The country's liberals strongly opposed to this decision, and furthered their ideas for a university in Brussels as a counterbalance to the Catholic institution. At the same time, Auguste Baron had just become a member of the freemasonic lodge Les Amis Philantropes. Baron was able to convince Pierre-Théodore Verhaegen, the president of the lodge, to support the idea for a new university. On 24 June 1834, Verhaegen presented his plan to establish a free university.

After sufficient funding was collected among advocates, the Université libre de Belgique ("Free University of Belgium") was inaugurated on 20 November 1834, in the Gothic Room of Brussels Town Hall. The date of its establishment is still commemorated annually, by students of its successor institutions, as a holiday called Saint-Verhaegen/Sint-Verhaegen (often shortened to St V) for Pierre-Théodore Verhaegen. In 1836, the university was renamed the Université libre de Bruxelles ("Free University of Brussels").

After its establishment, the Free University faced difficult times, since it did receive no subsidies or grants from the government; yearly fundraising events and tuition fees provided the only financial means. Verhaegen, who became a professor and later head of the new university, gave it a mission statement which he summarised in a speech to King Leopold I: "the principle of free inquiry and academic freedom uninfluenced by any political or religious authority." In 1858, the Catholic Church established the Saint-Louis Institute in the city, which subsequently expanded into a university in its own right.

Growth, internal tensions and move

The Free University grew significantly over the following decades. In 1842, it moved to the Granvelle Palace, which it occupied until 1928. It expanded the number of subjects taught and, in 1880, became one of the first institutions in Belgium to allow female students to study in some faculties. In 1893, it received large grants from Ernest and Alfred Solvay and Raoul Warocqué to open new faculties in the city. A disagreement over an invite to the anarchist geographer Élisée Reclus to speak at the university in 1893 led to some of the liberal and socialist faculty splitting away from the Free University to form the New University of Brussels (Université nouvelle de Bruxelles) in 1894. The institution failed to displace the Free University, however, and closed definitively in 1919.

In 1900, the Free University's football team won the bronze medal at the Summer Olympics. After Racing Club de Bruxelles declined to participate, a student selection with players from the university was sent by the Federation. The team was enforced with a few non-students. The Institute of Sociology was founded in 1902, then in 1904 the Solvay School of Commerce, which would later become the Solvay Brussels School of Economics and Management. In 1911, the university obtained its legal personality under the name Université libre de Bruxelles - Vrije Hogeschool te Brussel.

The German occupation during World War I led to the suspension of classes for four years in 1914–1918. In the aftermath of the war, the Free University moved its principle activities to the Solbosch in the southern suburb of Ixelles and a purpose-built university campus was created, funded by the Belgian American Educational Foundation. The university was again closed by the German occupiers during World War II on 25 November 1941. Students from the university were involved in the Belgian Resistance, establishing Groupe G which focused on sabotage.

Splitting of the university
Until the early 20th century, courses at the Free University were taught exclusively in French, the language of the upper class in Belgium at that time, as well as of law and academia. However, with the Dutch-speaking population asking for more rights in Belgium (see Flemish Movement), some courses began being taught in both French and Dutch at the Faculty of Law as early as 1935. Nevertheless, it was not until 1963 that all faculties offered their courses in both languages. Tensions between French- and Dutch-speaking students in the country came to a head in 1968 when the Catholic University of Leuven split along linguistic lines, becoming the first of several national institutions to do so.

On 1 October 1969, the French and Dutch entities of the Free University separated into two distinct sister universities. This splitting became official with the act of 28 May 1970, of the Belgian Parliament, by which the Dutch-speaking Vrije Universiteit Brussel (VUB) and the French-speaking Université libre de Bruxelles (ULB) officially became two separate legal, administrative and scientific entities.

Organisation 
The Vrije Universiteit Brussel is an independent institution. The members of all its governing entities are elected by the entire academic community – including faculty staff, researchers, personnel, and students. This system guarantees the democratic process of decision-making and the independence from state and outside organisations. Nevertheless, the university receives significant funding from the Flemish government, although less than other Flemish universities. Other important funding sources are grants for research projects (mostly from Belgian and European funding agencies), scholarships of academic members, revenues from cooperation with industry, and tuition fees to a lesser extent.

The main organisational structure of the Vrije Universiteit Brussel is its division into faculties:
Faculty of Law and Criminology
Faculty of Social Sciences & Solvay Business School
Faculty of Psychology and Educational Sciences
Faculty of Sciences and Bio-engineering Sciences
Faculty of Medicine and Pharmacy
Faculty of Arts and Philosophy
Faculty of Engineering
Faculty of Physical Education and Physiotherapy
These faculties benefit a wide autonomy over how they structure their educational programmes and research efforts, although their decisions need to comply with the university's statutes and must be approved by the central administration.

The central administration is formed by the Governing Board, which is currently presided by Eddy Van Gelder. It decides the university's long-term vision and must approve all decisions made by the faculties. The Governing Board is supported by three advising bodies: the Research Council, the Education Council, and the Senate. These bodies provide advice to the Governing Board on all issues regarding research, education, and the academic excellence of faculty staff, and may also propose changes to the university's strategy. The daily management of the university is the responsibility of the Rector and three Vice-Rectors. 

As of 2022 the rector of the Vrije Universiteit Brussel is Prof. Dr. Jan Danckaert, who succeeded Caroline Pauwels (1964-2022), who resigned in 2022 due to health reasons.

Education 

The Vrije Universiteit Brussel offers courses in a large variety of modern disciplines: law, economics, social sciences, management, psychology, physical sciences, life sciences, medical sciences, pharmaceutical sciences, humanities, engineering, physical education. About 12,000 students follow one of its 128 educational programmes. All programmes are taught in Dutch, but 59 are also taught in English. In agreement with the Bologna process, the university has implemented the so-called bachelor-master system. It therefore issues four types of degrees: bachelor's, master's, master after master's, and doctoral degrees.

Admission to the programmes is generally not restricted; anyone can subscribe to the programme of his/her choice. However, prerequisite degrees may be mandatory for advanced programmes, e.g., a bachelor's degree is required to subscribe to a master's programme, and a master's degree is required to subscribe to a master after master's or doctoral programme. An exception to this is the admission exam to the bachelor in medicine, which is required following ruling of the Flemish government. Tuition fees are low, and even decreased or eliminated for some students with less financial means.

The academic year is divided into two semesters, each spanning thirteen course weeks: the first semester lasts from October to January, the second semester from February to June. Students take exams in January and June. Apart from the Christmas and Easter holidays (both lasting two weeks) that are normally used to prepare for the exams, students are free the week between both semesters and during the summer vacations from July to September.

The university has implemented several quality control schemes in order to preserve the high quality of its educational programmes. Each semester, all students evaluate the courses they have followed. All programmes are also regularly assessed by internal panels and by external international visitation committees. Furthermore, all programmes are accredited by the Nederlands-Vlaamse Accreditatie Organisatie, an independent accreditation organisation charged with the accreditation of higher education programmes in both Flanders and the Netherlands.

Research 
Notable faculty:
 Diederik Aerts
 Kris Deschouwer
 Paul Devroey
 Mark Elchardus
 Francis Heylighen
 Jonathan Holslag
 Dave Sinardet
 Hugo Soly
 Luc Steels
 Jean-Paul Van Bendegem
 Willy van Ryckeghem
 Andre Van Steirteghem
 Irina Veretennicoff
 Els Witte
 Lode Wyns

Basic principles 
The Vrije Universiteit Brussel considers itself an open-minded and tolerant university. Its central principles are the Universal Declaration of Human Rights and in particular the principle of free inquiry for the progress of humanity. The latter includes the dismissal of any argument of authority and the right of free opinion. The Vrije Universiteit Brussel is the only Flemish university that has incorporated such principle in its statutes. The principle of free inquiry is often described by a quotation of the French mathematician and philosopher Henri Poincaré:

This principle is also reflected in the university's motto Scientia vincere tenebras, or Conquering darkness by science, and in its seal. The seal of the Vrije Universiteit Brussel displays a beggar's wallet and joined hands on the orange-white-blue (the colours of the Prince of Orange) escutcheon in the emblem, referring to the struggle of the Protestant Geuzen and the Prince of Orange against the oppressive Spanish rule and the Inquisition in the sixteenth century.

Another basic principle of the Vrije Universiteit Brussel – also incorporated in the university's statutes – is that the institution must be managed according to the model of democracy. Practically, this means that all members of the academic community — faculty staff, researchers, personnel, and students – are represented in all governing bodies. In this way, the university ensures that everyone has a voice in its decision-making processes and participates in its management. This principle must also guarantee the independence of the university and the academic freedom.

Campus and facilities 

Brussels Humanities, Sciences & Engineering Campus
Most of the faculties are located on the Etterbeek campus (which is actually located on the territory of the neighbouring borough of Elsene). It is the livelier of the two campuses and consists almost entirely of concrete structures, most built in the 1970s. Some are decaying rapidly but at least one, the Rectoraat designed by Renaat Braem, is heritage-listed.  Activities take place in numerous auditoriums and labs. In addition, there is a modern sports centre, a football pitch encircled by a running track, and a swimming pool. For eating out, there is a restaurant with subsidies for students and staff, and the bars/cafes 't Complex, Opinio, and KultuurKaffee. The  was a full-fledged concert venue during the evening/night, offering the university a cultural scene and organising free concerts and events. It was demolished to make space for the new XY construction project in 2015.

Brussels Health Campus
The campus in Jette is also a fully-fledged campus. The University Hospital is in the vicinity. All courses and research in the life sciences (medicine, pharmacy, dentistry, the biomedical and paramedical sciences) are located here.

Brussels Technology Campus
The campus Kaai in Anderlecht was established in 2013 and shared with the Erasmushogeschool Brussel. It houses the Industrial Engineering section of the Faculty of Engineering. Among extensive industrial laboratory facilities, the Brussels fablab has grown to the centre of activity on the campus in recent years.

Brussels Photonics Campus in Gooik.

Faculties
Languages and Humanities
Social Sciences and Solvay Business School
Engineering
Medicine and Pharmacy
Psychology and Educational Sciences
Sciences and Biomedical Sciences
Law and Criminology
Physical Education and Physiotherapy

Institutional cooperation 
The Vrije Universiteit Brussel cooperates with several institutions of higher education. They are:
 Brussels Chamber of Commerce
 Erasmushogeschool Brussel (together with the Vrije Universiteit Brussel they make up the Brussels University Association)
 UCLouvain Higher Institute for Re-adaptation Sciences
 Top Industrial Managers for Europe
 UCOS, the University Development Cooperation Centre
 UNICA, the Institutional Network of the UNIversities from the CApitals of Europe
 Université libre de Bruxelles
 University of Kent (Brussels School of International Studies)
 Vesalius College, an anglophone institution sharing the VUB campus
 XIOS Hogeschool Limburg and Provinciale Hogeschool Limburg
 Royal Military Academy
 Worldwide, on the international level the Vrije Universiteit Brussel has concluded institutional collaboration agreements with 38 universities all over the world, and student exchange agreements with 160 universities.

Academic Profiles

The university is included in major world university rankings such as  Times Higher Education World University Rankings, QS World University Rankings and Academic Ranking of World Universities.

Clinical Cardiac Electrophysiology

The Heart Rhythm Management Centre started its activities at the University Hospital UZ Brussel during spring 2007. The clinical activities soon rocketed to the #1 position in Belgium, and has been paralleled by important scientific production. Emerging fields of activity are multidisciplinary (clinical) and translational (research) programs in collaboration with the departments of Genetics, Pediatrics, Neonatology, Geriatrics, Neurology, as well as a fundamental research program in Physiology.

This Postgraduate course in Cardiac Electrophysiology and Pacing – is offered within the Faculty of Medicine and Pharmacy – after a specialization in Cardiology, and is supported by the Institute for Postgraduate Training of the Vrije Universiteit Brussel (iPAVUB). The core faculty for the Postgraduate program includes Prof. Dr. Pedro Brugada, who directs the EP fellowship training and the Cardiovascular Department, Prof. Dr. Carlo de Asmundis, Director of the Heart rhythm Management Centre, Prof. Dr. Gian Battista Chierchia, Director of Atrial Fibrillation Program, Prof. Dr. Marc La Meir and Prof. Dr. Francis Wellens, Director of Cardiac Surgery Service. Additional faculty who participate in the program includes: Prof. Dr. Bonduelle Mary-Louise and Prof. Dr. Ramon Brugada, who trains fellows in cardiac genetics, Prof. Dr. Joel Smets, University of Nijmegen, Nederland, who trains fellows in electrocardiography and basic electrophysiology.

Student life 

The BSG is the umbrella organisation for all other student organizations and acts as the defender of the moral interests of the students. Together with their French-speaking counterparts ACE at the ULB, they organise the annual St V memorial.

These are some of the student organizations at the VUB:
Studiekring vrij onderzoek: a collective of students from various faculties, promoting free inquiry through the organisation of debates, lectures and more
Letteren-en Wijsbegeertekring (LWK): for students studying at the Arts and Philosophy faculty
Perskring (PERS): for students studying Communication Sciences and Social Sciences 
Geneeskundige Kring (GK) and Farmaceutische Kring (FK): for students studying at the Medicine and Pharmacy faculty
Polytechnische Kring (PK) for students studying at the Engineering faculty
Psycho-Ped'Agogische Kring (PPK): for students studying at the Psychology and Educational Sciences faculty
Kring der Politieke Economische en Sociale Wetenschappen (KEPS) and Solvay ($); for students studying at the Economics and Political faculty
: for students studying at the faculty of Sciences and Bio-engineering Sciences
Mens Sana in Corpore Sano (Mesacosa or MC): for students studying at the Physical Education and Physiotherapy faculty
Vlaams Rechtsgenootschap (VRG): for students studying at the Law and Criminology faculty
Vrije Universiteit Brussel Model United Nations (VUBMUN): for all students of the VUB.

Members of these organizations (except VUBMUN) wear a klak (Dutch) or penne (French).

Furthermore, the VUB has student organizations for students with a specific regional background. They are: Antverpia (Antwerp), Westland (Westhoek), WUK (West Flanders), KBS (Brussels and Flemish Brabant), Campina (Campine), Kinneke Baba (East Flanders), Limburgia (Limburg), VSKM (Mechelen) and Hesbania (Haspengouw). VUB students also make up for the largest part of the secretive student club Boves Luci based in Jette. There are also several organizations for specific majors within a faculty, such as Infogroep (computer science), Biotecho (bio-engineering), bru:tecture (previously Pantheon) (architecture) and Promeco, Inisol and Business Club (economics). Last but not least there are organizations centered around a common interest, such as the Society of Weird And Mad People (SWAMP, for all kinds of games), BierKultuur (based on the rich beer culture in Belgium) and ZWK (on emancipation of women), Liberaal Vlaams Studentenverbond (LVSV, students interested in classic liberalism).

Notable alumni

Scientists and academics 

 Antoon Van den Braembussche (1946-).
 Patrick Baert (1961–)
 Willy Gepts (1922–1991)
 Leo Apostel (1925–1995)
 Clement Hiel (1952–)
 Christine Van Den Wyngaert (1952–), former Judge of the International Criminal Court.
 Jean Bourgain (1954–2018)
 Ingrid Daubechies (1954–), Belgian physicist and mathematician and Professor at Duke University.
 Peter Rousseeuw (1956-), Belgian statistician and professor at KU Leuven.
 Sophie de Schaepdrijver (1961–)
 Pattie Maes (1961-), Professor of Media Technology at Media Lab MIT
 Sathyabhama Das Biju (1963-), Indian amphibian biologist and wildlife conservationist.
 Frank Pattyn (1966-), Belgian glaciologist and professor at the Université libre de Bruxelles.
 Bob Coecke (1968-), Belgian theoretical physicist and logician and professor of Quantum Foundations, Logics and Structures at Oxford University.
 Kris Deschouwer
 Raymond Hamers, Discoverer of 'single-chain antibodies' or nanobodies.
 Steven Laureys
 Wim Leemans
 Helena Van Swygenhoven
 Els Witte
 Guido Geerts
 Johan Schoukens
 Ram Lakhan Ray (1968-)
 Kieran Moore, Chief Medical Officer of Health of Ontario Canada.

Artists 
 André Delvaux (1926–2002), Belgian film director.
 Jef Geeraerts (1930–), Belgian writer.
 Claude Coppens (1936-), Belgian pianist and composer. 
 Erik Pevernagie (1939), Belgian painter and writer.
 Marcel Vanthilt (1957-), Belgian singer and television presenter.
 Fabienne Demal (Axelle Red) (1968–), Belgian singer and songwriter.
 Stéphane Ginsburgh (1969-), Belgian pianist.

Businesspeople 
 Pieter De Leenheer
Tony Mary (1950–)
Felix Van de Maele

Politicians 

 Marco Formentini (1930-2021), Italian Politician & former mayor of Milan.
 Willy Claes (1938–), former Minister of Foreign Affair and former Secretary General of NATO.
 Louis Tobback (1938–), former mayor of Leuven and former Minister of the Interior - Belgium.
 Annemie Neyts-Uyttebroeck (1944-)
 Norbert De Batselier (1947–), 
 Marc Verwilghen (1952-), former Minister of Justice - Belgium.
 Karel De Gucht (1954–), former Minister of Foreign Affair - Belgium.
 Christian Leysen (1954–)
 Patrick Dewael (1955–), former Minister of the interior - Belgium.
 Frank Vanhecke (1959–)
 Bert Anciaux (1959–)
 Gunther Sleeuwagen (1958–)
 Jan Jambon (1960–)
 Maggie De Block (1962–), former Minister of Health - Belgium.
 Hans Bonte (1962-)
 Florika Fink-Hooijer (1962-)
 Zoran Milanović (1966–), President of Croatia.
 Bruno Tobback (1969-)
 Wouter Beke (1974-)
 Alexander De Croo (1975–), Prime Minister of Belgium
 Tinne Van der Straeten (1978-), Minister of Energy - Belgium.
 Zuhal Demir (1980-)
 Nadia Sminate (1981-)
 Sammy Mahdi (1988-)

Athletes 
 Sébastien Godefroid (1971–), Olympic sailor.
 Emma Meesseman, Belgian professional basketball player.
 Dirk Van Tichelt, Olympic judoka.
 Jürgen Roelandts, Belgian professional road bicycle racer.
 Kathleen Smet, Olympic triathlon.

Journalists 
 Yves Desmet
 Jean Mentens
 Danira Boukhriss, Flemish television presenter and newscaster.
 Tim Trachet, Belgian writer, publicist and journalist.

Honorary doctorates
Notable recipients of honorary doctorates (doctor honoris causa) at the Vrije Universiteit Brussel include:
 Nelson Mandela
 Václav Havel
 Jacques Cousteau
 Hans Blix
 Julia Gillard
 Noam Chomsky
 Dario Fo, Sonia Gandhi
 Natan Ramet
 Richard Stallman
 Johann Olav Koss
 Herman van Veen 
 Richard Dawkins
 Kim Clijsters
 Rom Harré
 Daniel Barenboim

See also 
 
 Flanders Interuniversity Institute of Biotechnology (VIB)
 Interuniversity Microelectronics Centre (IMEC)
 Science and technology in Brussels
 Science and technology in Flanders
 Top Industrial Managers for Europe
 Université libre de Bruxelles
 University Foundation
 List of split up universities

Notes and references

External links 
 Official website of the Vrije Universiteit Brussel
  Official website of the Vrije Universiteit Brussel
 More complete list of famous alumni (in Dutch)
 Find an officially recognised programme of this institution in the Higher Education Register
 V.Ir.Br. – VUB Engineering Alumni Association
 

 
Research institutes in Belgium
Education in Brussels
Educational institutions established in 1970
Business schools in Belgium
Engineering universities and colleges in Belgium
English as a global language
Information schools
1970 establishments in Belgium